The following is a timeline of the history of the city of Fargo, North Dakota, USA.

Prior to 20th century

 1670 – Rupert's Land, or Prince Rupert's Land, is a territory established in British North America comprising the Hudson Bay drainage basin.
 1811 – The Selkirk Concession (a land grant issued by the Hudson's Bay Company (HBC) to Thomas Douglas, 5th Earl of Selkirk) begins the Red River Colony colonization project.
 1871 – A.H. Moore's house (residence) built.
 1873
 Headquarters Hotel in business.
 Cass County established.
 January 5, 1875
 Fargo incorporated in Dakota Territory.
 County courthouse built.
 1876 – Population: 600.
 1880
 Fargo Daily Times newspaper begins publication.
 Population: 2,693.
 1889 – Town becomes part of the new U.S. state of North Dakota.
 1890 – North Dakota Agricultural College opens.
 1891 – Concordia College founded in nearby Moorhead, Minnesota.
 1893
 June 7: Fire.
 Opera house built.
 1894 – Fargo Forum and Daily Republican newspaper in publication.
 1897 – North Dakota Harness Company in business.
 1898
 Fargo Golf Club formed.
 Fram Norwegian-language newspaper in publication.
 1899 – St. Mary's Cathedral built.

20th century

 1900 – Population: 9,589; county 28,625.
 1903
 Public Library built.
 St. Paul's Evangelical Lutheran church founded.
 1904 – Fargo Street Railway begins operating.
 1906
 State Fair begins.
 Grand Theater opens. 
 1908 – St. Luke's Hospital opens.
 1912
 April: Preacher Billy Sunday visits town.
 July: Sangerfest (song festival) held.
 1914 – Princess Theatre opens.
 1917
 Woodrow Wilson High School established.
 John Miller Baer becomes U.S. representative for North Dakota's 1st congressional district.
 1920
 Pence Automobile Company Warehouse built.
 Population: 21,961; county 41,477.
 1922 – WDAY radio begins broadcasting.
 1926
 June 26: Gustaf of Sweden visits town.
 Fargo Theatre built.
 1927 – August 26: Charles Lindbergh visits town.
 1928 – Regan Brothers Bakery in business.
 1929 – Veterans' Hospital built.
 1930 – Post Office and Courthouse built.
 1931 – Fargo Civic Orchestra established.
 1935 – Dovre Ski Slide erected.
 1939 – June: Olav of Norway visits town.
 1940 – November 7: Duke Ellington at Fargo, 1940 Live recorded.
 1948
 KFGO radio begins broadcasting.
 American Crystal Sugar Company factory begins operating in nearby Moorhead, Minnesota.
 1954 – Herschel Lashkowitz becomes mayor.
 1957 – 1957 Fargo tornado.
 1960 – North Dakota State University active.
 1964 – Public educational KFME (TV) begins broadcasting.
 1966 – Fargo North High School and Daughters of Dakota Pioneers established.
 1969 – Red River Valley Genealogical Society founded.
 1970
 Bison Sports Arena built.
 Population: 53,365; county 73,653.
 1972 – West Acres Shopping Center in business.
 1974 – Sister city relationship established with Hamar, Norway.
 1975 – Plains Art Museum founded.
 1978 – Jon Lindgren becomes mayor.
 1983 – Greater Fargo-Moorhead Area Food Bank established.
 1986 – Hector Airport terminal built.
 1987 – Sister city relationship established with Vimmerby, Sweden.
 1990 – Historic Preservation Commission established.
 1992 – Fargodome (stadium) opens.
 1996
 Sundog (company) in business.
 Fictional Fargo film released.
 1997 – April: 1997 Red River flood.
 1998 – City website online (approximate date).

21st century

 2000 – Population: 90,599.
 2004 – The Ed Schultz Show (radio program) begins broadcasting.
 2006 – Dennis Walaker becomes mayor.
 2007 – Open magazine begins publication.
 2009 – 2009 Red River flood.
 2010 – Population: 105,549.
 2013
 Sanford Medical Center construction begins.
 Kevin Cramer becomes U.S. representative for North Dakota's at-large congressional district.
 2014 – Timothy Mahoney becomes mayor.
 2017 – Pride parade begins (approximate date).
 2021 – Woodrow Wilson High School renamed to "Dakota High School"

See also
 Fargo history
 List of mayors of Fargo, North Dakota

References

Bibliography

Published in the 20th century
 . + Chronology
 A Century Together: A History of Fargo, North Dakota, and Moorhead, Minnesota, Fargo-Moorhead Centennial Corporation (1975) 
 Fargo-Moorhead: A Guide to Historic Architecture, R. Ramsey (1975)
 Fargo's Heritage, N. Roberts (1983) 
 History and Growth of the City of Fargo: Historic Context Study, by Tim Holzkamm and Dean Dormanen, 1993. Revised and edited by David Danbom, 2001.
 Crossings: A Photographic Document of Fargo, North Dakota, C. McMullen & D. Arntson, et al. (1995)

Published in the 21st century
 
 The History and Growth of the City of Fargo, T. Holzkamm & D. Dormanen; D. Danbom (2001) 
 Fargo, North Dakota: From Frontier Village to All-America City, 1875–2000, Heritage Publications (2001) 
 Images of America: Fargo, North Dakota 1870–1940, D. Danbom & C. Strom (2002)

External links

 
 Items related to Fargo, various dates (via Digital Public Library of America).

Fargo, North Dakota
fargo
 
Years in North Dakota
fargo